Riot Boi is the debut studio album by New York-based rapper Le1f. It was released on November 13, 2015 on XL and Terrible Records. The album features contributions and production work from artists such as Evian Christ, Junglepussy, Balam Acab, Lunice, Boody, Sophie, and Dev Hynes.

Release and reception 

Riot Boi received positive reviews from critics, garnering a score of 78 out of 100 on aggregate site Metacritic. Clash called the album "a trailblazing record very much in the now," describing it as "bombastic, and transgressive." AllMusic wrote that "Riot Boi overwhelms with twists, turns, and surprises, all of which are exhilarating," noting in particular the record's "schizophrenic production that leaps from horny trap to frantic electroclash." Pitchfork wrote that "Riot Boi shows us a trailblazer sitting down among these cracked shards of glass, reckoning with what it means to have come first." Consequence of Sound wrote that "Riot Boi is easily Le1f’s most political music to date, arguing that the album "essentially turns intersectionality talking points into personal identifiers, and they line his sneakily clever raps and touching personal stories."

Track listing

References

External links
 

2015 debut albums
Leif (rapper) albums
Albums produced by Dev Hynes
Albums produced by Lunice
XL Recordings albums
Albums produced by Sophie (musician)